Buôn Ma Thuột (formerly Lac Giao) or sometimes Buôn Mê Thuột or Ban Mê Thuột, is the capital city of Đắk Lắk Province in the Central Highlands of Vietnam. Its population was 420,000 in 2016, and grew to 502,170 by 2018. The city is the largest in Vietnam's Central Highlands region, and is famous as the regional "capital of coffee".

Buôn Ma Thuột is served by Buôn Ma Thuột Airport.

Geography

The city is located at 12.6667° N 108.0500° E, right at the heart of the Central Highlands of Vietnam, 1300 km from Hanoi, 500 km from Da Nang, and 350 km from Ho Chi Minh City. Buôn Ma Thuột is the capital of Đắk Lắk Province and also the biggest city in the Central Highlands region (Tây Nguyên).

History
In 1904 Đắk Lắk Province was established by the French and Buôn Ma Thuột was selected as the provincial administrative centre, rather than the trading center of Đôn on the Srepok River. Buôn Ma Thuột was originally settled by the Ê Đê, but due to the incoming Việt settlement after the Vietnam War and the active acculturation policy, less than 15% (around 40,000) are still Montagnards. An important battle took place there at the end of the Vietnam war.

Institutions
Buôn Ma Thuột is the site of Tây Nguyên University, which was founded in 1977 and has educated more than 27,000 students. The TNU offers training in 37 university programs, 8 college programs, and 6 college-university interlinking programs and pre-university programs.

Climate

See also
Sacred Heart Cathedral, Buôn Ma Thuột

References

External links

 "Establishing Buon Ma Thuot City and Adjusting the Border Between it and the Districts of Cu Jut, Ea Sup and Krong Pac of Darlac Province" Laws of Vietnam, Decree 8-CP, 21 January 1995
 "Buon Ma Thuot, Vietnam" Falling Rain Genomics, Inc.

 
Populated places in Đắk Lắk province
Districts of Đắk Lắk province
Provincial capitals in Vietnam
Cities in Vietnam